Hemant Sharma is a modern, pop and folk singer from Nepal. His first album was Oh Priya,released in 2000. However, it was his song "Maya Sarhai Mahango" from a 2002 album that brought him into the limelight. Sharma has recorded more than 100 songs and released more than seven solo albums. Sharma was also president of the Performers Society Of Nepal from 2015 to 2017.

Early life 
Sharma was born in Nawalparsai. His father is Danda Pani Sharma and his mother is Sumitra Sharma.  He moved to Kathmandu for his studies, and started singing in college. Sharma has released more than 100 songs, including "Maya sarai mahango", "Aaudai gara malati" and "Mul hau bhane rasaideu".

Awards

Discography 

 Mul hau bhane 
 Aaudai gara malati
 Timi bahek mero koi chhaina
 Ban maryo banmarale - with Bishnu Majhi
 Thapana thapa hataima
 Lajai lajai
 Maya sarhai mahango
 Maya yesto hos
 Hello sister hello mister
 Ke maya garnu hunna ra
 Barikha
 Ukali jada jadai
 Nacha Nacha
 Hunna hunna
 Timi arkai gharko manxe
 Chhoyo mayale

References

External links 

 Facebook
 YouTube

Living people
Nepalese folk singers
21st-century Nepalese male singers
People from Nawalparasi District
Nepalese pop singers
Year of birth missing (living people)
Dohori singers